Abubakar Bello-Osagie (born 11 August 1988), commonly known as Abubakar or Abu, is a Nigerian professional footballer who plays as a striker, most recently for Marsaskala in Malta.

Career
Born in Benin City, Edo State, in 2005, he left Bendel Insurance of his home city of Benin, and joined River Plate in Argentina. After four months playing for the club from Buenos Aires, Abubakar joined Brazilian club Internacional in 2006, through Argentine entrepreneur Marcelo Housemann, playing for the club's B team. At Internacional he was teammates with Alexandre Pato and Luis Adriano. His performances with the B-Team were good, scoring a few goals in the Second Division, but he only managed a few first team appearances.

Bello-Osagie joined Rio de Janeiro-based club Vasco in December 2007, after being scouted by the former footballer Bismarck. On 17 July 2008, he stayed on the bench for the first time, against Goiás, playing his first professional league match as a Vasco player on 20 July 2008, when his club was defeated by Atlético-PR 3–1 at Arena da Baixada, Curitiba, for the Campeonato Brasileiro Série A. He played four Série A matches in 2008, without scoring a goal. Abu signed on 29 April 2009 for Caxias. 

In the summer of 2010 Abu signed for Qormi in the Maltese Premier Division, where he enjoyed a very successful spell and achieved several accolades, such as 'Player of the Month'. He played for various clubs in Malta from 2010, before leaving Marsaskala in 2022.

References

External links
Abubakar Bello-Osagie at MFA

Living people
1988 births
Nigerian footballers
Nigerian expatriate footballers
Sportspeople from Benin City
Bendel Insurance F.C. players
Sport Club Internacional players
Club Atlético River Plate footballers
CR Vasco da Gama players
Sociedade Esportiva e Recreativa Caxias do Sul players
Qormi F.C. players
Valletta F.C. players
Sliema Wanderers F.C. players
Victoria Hotspurs F.C. players
Pembroke Athleta F.C. players
Senglea Athletic F.C. players
Lija Athletic F.C. players
Naxxar Lions F.C. players
Marsaskala F.C. players
Expatriate footballers in Argentina
Expatriate footballers in Brazil
Expatriate footballers in Malta
Nigerian expatriate sportspeople in Argentina
Nigerian expatriate sportspeople in Brazil
Nigerian expatriate sportspeople in Malta
Association football midfielders